Tortriculladia is a genus of moths of the family Crambidae.

Species
Tortriculladia argentimaculalis (Hampson, 1919)
Tortriculladia belliferens (Dyar, 1914)
Tortriculladia eucosmella (Dyar, 1914)
Tortriculladia mignonette (Dyar, 1914)
Tortriculladia mixena Bleszynski, 1967
Tortriculladia pentaspila (Zeller, 1877)

References

Natural History Museum Lepidoptera genus database

Crambini
Crambidae genera
Taxa named by Stanisław Błeszyński